This is a list of candidates in 2017 Iranian presidential election which were held on 19 May 2017.

According to Iranian electoral law, all Iranian citizens have the right to nominate themselves. A total of 1636 persons registered for the presidential election, of which 1499 were men and 137 women. The youngest candidate was 18 and the oldest 92.

List
This list includes prominent candidates who announced, withdrew, declined or were disqualified their nomination for the election.

Registered candidates

Office holders
Sort by time of registration

Non-office holders 
 Hooshang Amirahmadi (Rejected), an Iranian-American academic and political analyst announced he will run for the office for a third time on 23 March 2017. His nomination was rejected formerly for his last candidacies for not held an executive office in Iranian government. He registered on 13 April 2017.
 Khosro Nassirizadeh (Rejected), a physician announced he will run on 5 April 2017. He registered on 11 April. He was also registered in 2009 and 2013 elections but his nomination was rejected.
 Saeed Yari (Rejected), announced his candidacy on 26 January 2017 in a public meeting. He registered on 14 April 2017.
 Amrollah Sheikhiani (Rejected), Secretary-General of People's Party was announced as presidential candidate by his party on 14 March 2017. He registered on 14 April 2017. He has not held any governmental office previously.
 Mehdi Khazali (Rejected), a blogger and publisher and son of leading right-wing cleric Abolghasem Khazali announced he will run on 24 March 2017. He was a supporter of Hassan Rouhani in the last election but has criticized his human rights policies. He registered on 11 April 2017.
 Mohsen Gharvian (Rejected), a cleric and religious teacher announced his nomination on 8 April 2017 and registered on 15 April.
 Javad Golpayegani (Rejected), an actor and producer nominated on 12 April 2017.
 Mahdi Kalhor (Rejected), a journalist and press advisor to the former president Mahmoud Ahmadinejad registered on 12 April 2017.
 Maryam Ebrahimvand (Rejected), cinema director nominated on the first day of registration on 11 April 2017.
 Aminollah Rashidi (Rejected), a 91-year singer and composer nominated on 14 April 2017.
 Abbas Palizdar (Rejected), a lawyer and former Secretary of the Judiciary Inquiry and Review Committee in the Iranian parliament registered on 15 April 2017. Palizdar was sentenced to a ten-year trial in 2008, but he was released in 2010 after two years.
 Alireza Metani (Rejected), Secretary-General of Defense Party of Veterans and Constitution announced his nomination on 11 April 2017
 Mohammad Ghafari (Rejected), former police-commander of Sistan and Baluchestan Province announced his nomination on 12 April 2017
 Sirus Meymanat (Rejected), an actor and screenplay-writer announced his nomination on 12 April 2017
 Alireza Rajaei (Rejected), an advisor of Presidential Administration of Iran announced his nomination on 13 April 2017
 Bahman Lame'ei (Rejected), former deputy-head of Iran Insurance Company announced his nomination on 14 April 2017
 Hassan Bayadi (Rejected), former vice-chairman of City Council of Tehran and Secretary-General of Young Builders Party announced his nomination on 15 April 2017
 Ali Geramian (Rejected), a cultural advisor of the Minister of Industries and Business announced his nomination on 15 April 2017

Withdrew candidates

During campaigning  
 Mohammad Bagher Ghalibaf, Mayor of Tehran registered for a third bid on 15 April 2017. He was approved by Guardian Council along with 5 other candidates. However, he withdrew his candidacy on 15 May 2017 and endorsed Ebrahim Raisi.
 Eshaq Jahangiri, incumbent First Vice President of Iran registered on 15 April 2017 as a tactical candidate. He was approved by Guardian Council but  withdrew on 16 May 2017 and endorsed Hassan Rouhani.

Before campaigning 
 Vahab Azizi, Secretary-General of the Jihadist of Islamic Iran registered as a presidential candidate on 11 April 2017. He withdrew on 14 April 2017.
 Ghodrat-Ali Heshmatian, former member of the parliament from Sonqor registered on 15 April 2017. He previously announced his candidacy on 20 March 2017. He withdrew his nomination on 18 April with sending a letter to the Guardian Council.
 Mohammad Zareh Foumani, Secretary-General of Popular Party of Reforms announced his nomination on 17 March 2017 and registered on 13 April. He withdrew on 19 April 2017.

Announced but did not enroll 
 On 15 March 2017, Ezzatollah Zarghami announced his candidacy via his social media accounts. He said he "has felt the responsibility to fix the country's management structure on a macro scale", accepting "the invitation of the Popular Front of Islamic Revolution Forces". Zarghami who was speculated as a potential candidate since late 2014, denied the possibility of his own candidacy in November 2015. After he was ranked 8th at JAMNA election, he said he will be withdrew and help to the party's choices.
 On 6 February 2017, General Mohammad-Hassan Nami of Iranian Army, a former communications minister announced his candidacy. However, he not registered for the election.
 Mohammad Ashrafi Esfahani, former member of the parliament from Kermanshah announced his candidacy on 3 March 2017. He did not registered for the election and withdrew.
 Saeed Jalili, former Secretary of the Supreme National Security Council was one of the potential presidential candidates. His candidacy was announced by his campaign members at the last election. However, he decided not to register for the election.
 YEKTA Front has officially announced that Hamid-Reza Haji Babaee and Rostam Ghasemi are its possible candidates. However, Ghasemi did not registered for the election.
 Mehrdad Bazrpash, one of the five JAMNA's candidates did not registered at the election unless his presence at the Ministry of Interior. His candidacy was happened minutes after the end of the legal registration time and was incomplete.

Declined to run
 In late March 2016, Mohammad Javad Zarif said “I will definitely not run for president because my current job is the only thing I know how to do”.
 On 22 June 2016, Hassan Hashemi said he will not run, stressing he is “not interested in politics”.
 In a statement published on 15 September 2016, Major General Qasem Soleimani called speculations about his candidacy as “divisive reports by the enemies” and said he will “always remain a simple soldier serving Iran and the Islamic Revolution”.
 On 12 December 2016, Mohsen Rezaei announced that he “has no decision to run for president”.
 Kamal Kharazi, former foreign minister was considered as a potential presidential candidate. However, he declined his candidacy.
 Kamran Daneshjoo, former Science Minister and head of electoral council in 2009 election has rejected his candidacy.
 Ali Akbar Salehi, former foreign minister and current Head of Atomic Energy Organization was considered as potential presidential candidate. He rejected his nomination and said that he is wiser than to nominate himself.
 Parviz Fattah, President of the Imam Khomeini Relief Foundation and former Energy Minister has rejected his candidacy in 2017.
 Gholam-Ali Haddad-Adel, former parliament chairman announced he has no plans for the candidacy.
 Sadegh Kharazi, leader of NEDA Party and former ambassador to the France announced he would not candidate if Hassan Rouhani run for the office.
 Ali Larijani, chairman of the parliament has denied his candidacy. He first said he has no plans for the upcoming election in June 2016. On 15 September 2016, he officially announced that he would not nominate.
 Marzieh Vahid-Dastjerdi, former health minister and first female minister in the Iranian cabinet since 1979 was rumors as the potential principlists' candidate. She rejected her candidacy after the creation of JAMNA that she was elected as its spokesperson.

See also
Iranian presidential election, 2017
List of candidates in the Iranian presidential election, 2013
Elections in Iran

References

External links
 Ministry of Interior

Candidates for President of Iran
2017 Iranian presidential election